Stephen John Greif (26 August 1944 – 23 December 2022) was an English actor known for his roles as Travis in Blake's 7, Harry Fenning in three series of Citizen Smith, Signor Donato in Casanova and Commander John Shepherd in Shoot on Sight.

Early life
Greif was born in Sawbridgeworth, Hertfordshire, England, in a building originally belonging to Anne Boleyn as a gift from King Henry VIII. He was educated at Sloane Grammar School, where he was school champion in athletics and swimming and represented the school and the county in athletics at the White City Stadium amongst other locales. He briefly attended the Regent Street Polytechnic before entering a variety of jobs including trouble shooter at a TV and radiogram manufacturer and as a negotiator in a boutique West End estate agency before applying for drama school.

Career

Greif was an honours graduate of the Royal Academy of Dramatic Art, where he won numerous awards including Best Actor and Most Promising Actor, and was an Associate Member and served on the audition panel. He was a member of the National Theatre Company both at the Old Vic in Laurence Olivier's company and on the South Bank for Peter Hall's company. Among the productions he appeared in were Danton's Death, A Woman Killed with Kindness, The Merchant of Venice (with Olivier), Long Day's Journey into Night (again with Olivier), The School for Scandal, Richard II, The Front Page and Macbeth.

Greif was invited back to appear with them at Queen's Theatre in the West End in the Italian Comedy Saturday, Sunday, Monday, directed by Franco Zeffirelli and Laurence Olivier, where he won a Best Actor nomination in the Critics' Circle Theatre Award. Later, he was invited to join the National again on the South Bank under Peter Hall in the revival of Death of a Salesman, directed by Michael Rudman and with Warren Mitchell winning himself another Best Actor nomination in the Olivier Awards. Grief was back again at the invitation of Nicholas Hytner to join his inaugural season appearing in His Girl Friday, Edmund and the Christmas production His Dark Materials. He acted alongside Elaine Stritch in The Gingerbread Lady, Denholm Elliott in The Paranormalist, Frank Langella in Abracadaver, Albert Finney in Ronald Harwood's Reflected Glory, Felicity Kendal and Frances de la Tour in Fallen Angels, Joseph Fiennes in George Dillon and Lesley Manville in Six Degrees of Separation. He appeared in three plays by his friend Bernard Kops, an East End playwright and poet, at the Jewish Museum, the JW3 and the National Portrait Gallery to celebrate the author's 85th and 90th birthdays.

From 2016 to 2018, together with Fenella Fielding, Greif appeared at Crazy Coqs at Zedel's Brasserie on multiple occasions, and various other venues in David Stuttard's adaptation of drama and comedy from famous ancient Greek literature called Tears, Treachery..and Just a little Murder produced by Simon McKay. The production was revived in 2020/21, with Dame Sian Phillips replacing Fielding, and retitled Savage Beauty, playing again at Crazy Coqs with further shows to come, this time entitled Lovers, Traitors...and bloody Greeks.

Greif appears in many films including Gerry, Risen, Woman in Gold, Bill, D is for Detroit, Lasse Hallström's Casanova, Shoot on Sight, Eichmann, Spartan, The Upside of Anger, Boogie Woogie and Fakers. His many television appearances include Only When I Laugh, Thriller (1 episode, 1976), Howard's Way, Spooks, Mistresses, He Kills Coppers, Silent Witness, the last story of Waking the Dead, The Crown, The Alienist: Angel of Darkness, Doctors and New Tricks.

Greif reprised his Blake's 7 role of Travis in eleven new audio stories for Big Finish Productions. He voiced Raymond Maarloeve in the video game The Witcher. He voiced and was nominated for best narrator for Sony's PlayStation Video game Puppeteer in addition to many more games and cartoon series including Elliott from Earth for the Cartoon Network.

Greif won the BBC audio books of America award for narrating The Boy with the Magic Numbers by Sally Gardner. He also narrated various documentaries on Channel 5, and in 2021 contributed to and participated in the documentary tribute Alfred Burke is Frank Marker.

Personal life and death
Greif enjoyed golf, and was a member and past President of the Stage Golfing Society. He married in 1980; the marriage produced twin sons in 1982. He resided near Richmond in London.

Greif died on 23 December 2022, aged 78.

Filmography

Film and television

Theatre

Radio and audiobooks

Awards and nominations

References

External links

Stephen Greif at the British Film Institute
Stephen Greif (Aveleyman)

1944 births
2022 deaths
Alumni of RADA
English Jews
English male film actors
English male radio actors
English male television actors
Jewish English male actors
Male actors from Hertfordshire
People from Sawbridgeworth